Patton & Fisher was an architectural firm in Chicago, Illinois.  It operated under that name from 1885 to 1899 and later operated under the names Patton, Fisher & Miller (1899–1901) and Patton & Miller (1901–1915).  Several of its works are listed on the National Register of Historic Places.

Firm history
The firm of Patton & Fisher was established in 1885 by architects Normand Smith Patton (July 10, 1852 - May 12, 1915) and Reynolds Fisher.  The firm continued to operate under that name until 1899.  In 1899, the firm became Patton, Fisher & Miller when Grant C. Miller became a partner.  In 1901, Fisher left the practice, and the firm became known as Patton & Miller.  Normand Patton was a partner in the firm during its entire existence from 1885 until his death in 1915.  Patton was also a Fellow of the American Institute of Architects.

The firm has several works that are listed on the National Register of Historic Places.

Works

The works of Patton & Fisher and successor firms include:

Patton & Fisher

Chicago
Belmonte Flats (1893), 4257-4259 S. Dr. Martin Luther King Jr. Dr., and 400-412 E. 43rd St., Chicago, Illinois (Patton and Fisher), NRHP-listed
Chicago Theological Seminary, Chicago
Henry H. Donaldson Residence (1895), 5740 Woodlawn Avenue, Chicago
Erie Apartment Building (1891), later the Hotel Dana Hotel, 666 N. State St., Chicago, built 1891, demolished 2006
First Baptist Church of Hyde Park
Reynolds Fisher House (1890), 4734 North Kimbark Avenue, Chicago
Richard Norman Foster House (1892), 1532 West Jackson Boulevard, Chicago
Joseph H. Howard House (1891), 4801 North Kimbark Avenue, Chicago
Illinois Institute of Technology, formerly Armour Institute of Technology: Machinery Hall (1901) and the Main Building (1891–1893), 3300 S. Federal Street, Chicago
The Kenwood Club (1896), Chicago (Patton & Fisher with Charles S. Frost) 
Lincoln Park Zoo Headquarters (1893), formerly the Matthew Lafflin Memorial Building at the Chicago Academy of Sciences, 2001 North Clark Street, Chicago
Jacques Loeb Residence (c. 1896), 5754 Woodlawn Avenue, Chicago
Newberry Hotel (c. 1891), 817 N. Dearborn St., Chicago, demolished 1960s
W. S. Walker Residences (1887), block of four houses on Ellis Avenue near 37th Street, Chicago
Washington Park Congregational Church (1896), 129 E. 51st St. (originally 1010 E. 51st St.), Chicago

Oak Park
Cicero Gas Company Building (1893), 115 N. Oak Park Avenue, Oak Park, Illinois
William A. Douglas House (1893), 317 North Kenilworth Avenue, Oak Park, Illinois
David J. Kennedy House (1888), 309 North Kenilworth Avenue, Oak Park, Illinois
Walter Thomas Mills House (1897), 601 North Kenilworth Avenue, Oak Park, Illinois
Pilgrim Congregational Church (1889, 1899), 460 West Lake Street, Chicago (south half by Patton & Fisher, 1889; north half by Patton, Fisher & Miller, 1899)
John Rankin House (1891), 245 N. Kenilworth Avenue, Oak Park, Illinois
Scoville Block (1899), 116-132 N. Oak Park Avenue, Oak Park, Illinois
Scoville Institute, later known as Oak Park Public Library, Oak Park, Illinois
Second Congregational Church, Chicago (Patton & Fisher; and Patton, Fisher & Miller)
Richard S. Thain Residence, Oak Park, Illinois

Beloit

Beloit College Academy, Beloit, Wisconsin
Beloit College, Edward Dwight Eaton Chapel (1891-1892), Beloit, Wisconsin (renovations in 1938 and 1954 designed by Maurice Webster)
Beloit College, Emerson Hall (1897-1898), Beloit, Wisconsin (Patton & Fisher), NRHP-listed (converted into a senior citizen apartment center in 1982)
Beloit College, Scoville Hall (1889-1890), Beloit, Wisconsin (demolished in 1973)
Beloit College, Smith Gymnasium Building, Beloit, Wisconsin

Muskegon and Kalamazoo

Hackley Library (1889), Muskegon, Michigan
Hackley Manual Training School (1897), Muskegon, Michigan
Kalamazoo Public Library (1891-1893), Kalamazoo, Michigan
Muskegon High School, Muskegon, Michigan

Elsewhere

Gardner Museum of Architecture and Design (1888), originally the Free Public Library, 32 Maine Street, Quincy, Illinois
James W. Ridgway Residence (1888), Hinsdale, Illinois
Scoville Memorial Library-Carleton College (1896), renamed Scoville Hall in 1957, 1st St., E. and College St., Northfield, Minnesota (Patton & Fisher), NRHP-listed
State Savings Loan and Trust, 428 Maine St., Quincy, Illinois (Patton & Fisher), NRHP-listed
Wichita State University, Fairmount College of Liberal Arts and Sciences (c. 1888), Wichita, Kansas
Williston Hall at Wheaton College (1895), Wheaton, Illinois

Patton, Fisher & Miller

Goshen Carnegie Public Library (1901), 202 South 5th St., Goshen, Indiana (Patton, Fisher & Miller), NRHP-listed (Indiana's first Carnegie library)
Memorial Baptist Church, Chicago (Patton, Fisher & Miller)
Monumental Baptist Church, Chicago (Patton, Fisher & Miller)

Patton & Miller
 See Patton & Miller

See also
Patton & Miller
Normand Smith Patton

References

Architecture firms based in Chicago